Mohammad bin Mohamarin is a Malaysian politician who has served as Member of the Sabah State Legislative Assembly (MLA) for Banggi since May 2018. He served as the State Assistant Minister of Education and Innovation of Sabah in the Heritage Party (WARISAN) state administration under former Chief Minister Shafie Apdal and former State Minister  Yusof Yacob from May 2018 to the collapse of WARISAN state administration in September 2020. He is a member of the Parti Gagasan Rakyat Sabah (GAGASAN), a component party of the Gabungan Rakyat Sabah (GRS) coalition. He was member of the WARISAN and United Malays National Organisation (UMNO), a component party of the Barisan Nasional (BN) coalition.

Election results

References

Living people
Malaysian Muslims
Members of the Sabah State Legislative Assembly
Former Sabah Heritage Party politicians
Year of birth missing (living people)
Former United Malays National Organisation politicians